Oeno Island or Holiday Island is a coral atoll in the South Pacific Ocean, part of the Pitcairn Islands overseas territory.

Geography 
There are two larger and three smaller islets on or within the rim of the atoll. Their aggregate land area is only . Oeno serves as a private holiday site for the few residents of Pitcairn Island, who travel there and stay for two weeks in January because Oeno has beaches while Pitcairn doesn't.

It is located in the southwest part of the atoll's lagoon. There is a water tap installed on the island. Sandy Island (or Islands) is to the northeast, within the lagoon, and may be an ephemeral island. Three smaller islets are to the south and west of the main island.

Important Bird Area 
The island has been identified by BirdLife International as an Important Bird Area (IBA) principally for its colony of Murphy's petrels, which, at some 12,500 pairs, is estimated to be the second largest colony of these birds in the world.

Maps

History  
 January 1819: Captain James Henderson of the British East India Company ship Hercules sights Oeno Island
1822–1823 Captain Ralph Bond in sealing brig Martha of London saw this island, presumably in the summer/autumn of 1822.
 26 January 1824: Captain George Worth aboard the American whaler Oeno names the atoll after his ship
 5 March 1858: The Wild Wave, a 1500-ton clipper ship sailing from San Francisco, is wrecked on Oeno's reef
 1875: The Khandeish is wrecked on Oeno
 23 August 1883: The Oregon is wrecked on Oeno
 April 1893: The Bowdon is wrecked on Oeno
 10 July 1902: Oeno annexed by the United Kingdom
 1938: Incorporated into the Pitcairn Islands colony
 1997: Polynesian rats exterminated
 2 July 2019: Oeno Island experienced a total solar eclipse

See also

 Desert island
 List of islands

References

External links 

 Oeno Photo Tour – Pitcairners spending holidays on the island
 Island Evolution: Oeno Island from NASA Earth Observatory
 Map of Oeno Island

Atolls of the Pitcairn Islands
Uninhabited islands of the Pitcairn Islands
Sandy islands
Ephemeral islands
Island restoration
Important Bird Areas of the Pitcairn Islands